State Route 61 (SR 61) is an  state highway in the west-central part of the U.S. state of Alabama. The southern terminus of the highway is at an intersection with U.S. Route 80 (US 80) at Uniontown. The northern terminus of the highway is at an intersection with SR 14 at Greensboro.

Route description

SR 61 travels through Alabama's Black Belt region, perhaps the poorest area of the state. From its southern terminus at Uniontown, the highway travels through a sparsely-populated region along a two-lane road in a general northward trajectory. The highway takes a slight turn towards the northwest as it approaches its northern terminus at Greensboro.

Major intersections

See also

References

061
Transportation in Perry County, Alabama
Transportation in Hale County, Alabama